Abingdon Road Halt railway station was built by the Great Western Railway to serve South Hinksey, a village near Oxford.

History
It was on the southern side of Abingdon Road, which crosses the railway here over a brick bridge known locally as the Red Bridge.

When the railmotor services were withdrawn on 22 March 1915, the halt closed. The line was quadrupled during 1942, and little, if any, trace remains.

Route

Notes

References

External links
Site of Abingdon Road Halt on a navigable 1946 O.S. map

Disused railway stations in Oxfordshire
Former Great Western Railway stations
Railway stations in Great Britain opened in 1908
Railway stations in Great Britain closed in 1915
1908 establishments in England